Addis Ababa University (AAU) is a  national university located in Addis Ababa, Ethiopia. It is the oldest university in Ethiopia. AAU has thirteen campuses. AAU has several associated research institutions including the Institute of Ethiopian Studies. The Ministry of Education admits qualified students to AAU based on their score on the Ethiopian University Entrance Examination (EUEE).

History

The origins of AAU was a two-year college in 1950 by the Jesuit Lucien Matte, at the appeal of His Majesty Emperor Haile Selassie I. It began operations the following year. Over the following two years an affiliation with the University of London, and University of Oxford was developed. Africans from various parts of the continent would receive free scholarships through  programs subsidized by the Organisation of African Unity for higher learning. AAU was also known for sending its students abroad for an extended interpersonal educational experience, and having those students return with the exemplary standards of the international community.

The nucleus of AAU was formed with the establishment of the University College of Addis Ababa (UCAA) in 1950. UCAA, which initially consisted of the Faculties of Arts and Science, became a fully fledged college when it was chartered in 1954. In 1955, the Building College was opened. In February 1961, these various colleges and the Theological College were brought together to form the Haile Selassie University. Emperor Haile Selassie I gave his Guenete Leul Palace to serve as the administration building and main campus. He had abandoned the palace, where a number of his ministers and favorites were killed in the wake of the abortive Coup d'état in 1960, in favor of the new Jubilee Palace. Following the 1974 revolution, the university was briefly renamed University of Ethiopia (National University) before it came to assume its present designation, AAU, in 1975. In the wake of the revolution, AAU was closed for two years and students and staff were drafted into what was known as the Development through Cooperation Campaign (zemecha), designed to arise the awareness of the rural population in the spirit of the revolution. The university offered its first Master's programs in 1979 and its first PhD programs in 1987.

Administration 
Until 1974 the charter provided for a governance structure in the following descending order or authority: Chancellor (the Emperor himself); the Board of Governors, composed of ministers and members of the royal family; and the Faculty Council, made up of the university officers, deans, directors and elected members. The Faculty later became the Senate. In 1977, the AAU lost its relative autonomy when it was brought under the Commission for Higher Education, which came to exercise administrative jurisdiction over all institutions of higher learning. In 1993, AAU was placed under the Ministry of Education by a government proclamation.

Influence
Over and above their academic  pursuits, AAU students have been actively engaged in community service (such as conducting literacy programs) and political struggle, particularly in the years before the 1974 revolution. In the late 1960s and early 1970s, students were required to do a year of national service under the Ethiopia University Service program. University teachers and students were instrumental in exposing the hidden 1973 famine and launching the first famine relief program. The Ethiopian Student Movement, of which the university was the birthplace and main venue, played a pivotal role in bringing about the revolution. Almost all leaders of the political organizations that were active in the revolutionary years or are in power now had their political formation inside the university. In 2013/2014, there were 33,940 undergraduate students, 13,000 graduate students, and 1,733 PhD students, making a total student body of 48,673.

Campuses and colleges

Colleges 

 College of Biological Engineering
 College of Social Sciences 
 College of Humanities, Language Studies, Journalism and communication 
 College of Development Studies 
 College of Business and Economics 
 College of Law and Governance Studies 
 College of Education and Behavioral Studies 
 College of Natural and Computational Sciences 
 Skunder Boghossian College of Performing and Visual Arts 
 College of Veterinary Medicine and Agriculture 
 College of Health Science

Research and teaching institutes 

 Academy of Ethiopian Languages and Cultures 
 Addis Ababa Institute of Technology 
 Aklilu Lemma Institute of Pathobiology 
 Ethiopian Institute of Architecture, Building Construction and City Development 
 Ethiopian Institute of Water Resources 
 Institute of Biotechnology 
 Institute of Educational Research 
 Institute of Ethiopian Studies 
 Institute of Geophysics, Space Science and Astronomy 
 Institute of Peace and Security Studies 
 Horn of Africa Regional Center and Environment Network 
 Institute of Development and Policy  Research/IDPR/

Schools 

 Alle School of Fine Arts and Design 
 School of Allied Health Sciences 
 School of Commerce 
 School of Earth Sciences 
 School of Information Science 
 School of Journalism and Communications 
 School of Medicine 
 School of Pharmacy 
 School of Public Health 
 School of Social Work 
 Yared School of Music 
 Yoftahe Nigussie School of Theatrical Arts

Notable dropouts 
 
 Isaias Afwerki abandoned his studies in 1966 and traveled to Kassala, Sudan to join the Eritrean Liberation Front.
 Meles Zenawi in 1975 left the university to join the  Tigray People's Liberation Front  and fight against the Derg (the Mengistu Haile Mariam-led military government in Ethiopia).

Notable alumni

Prime Ministers 
Hailemariam Desalegn (2012-2018)
Abiy Ahmed Ali (2018-)

Presidents 
Rupiah Banda (Zambia) (1959-1960)
Mustafa Mohoumed Omer (Somali Region)

Vice presidents 
 Hirut Woldemariam

Physicists 
 Mulugeta Bekele

Historians 
 Taddesse Tamrat
Kinfe Abraham
Merid Wolde Aregay

Biologists 
 Tewolde Berhan Gebre Egziabher
 Legesse Wolde-Yohannes
 Sebsebe Demissew
 Segenet Kelemu
 Masresha Fetene

Engineers 
 Simegnew Bekele

Chemists 
 Sinknesh Ejigu

Linguists
 Azeb Amha

Pharmacologists 
 Eleni Aklillu

Anthropologists 
Berhane Asfaw
Yohannes Haile-Selassie
Zeresenay Alemseged
Alula Pankhurst

Authors 
 Hama Tuma
 Sebhat Gebre-Egziabher
 Baalu Girma
 Bewketu Seyoum

Economics 
 Berhanu Nega

Lawyers 
 Birtukan Mideksa

Obstetrician-gynecologist 
 Lia Tadesse

References

External links

Addis Ababa University official website
Institute of Ethiopian Studies and the Ethnological Museum
Contact information for Addis Ababa University, and 28 Ethiopian institutions of higher education in the African Higher Education Database

 
Universities and colleges in Ethiopia
1950 establishments in Ethiopia
Educational institutions established in 1950
Haile Selassie